Veneta may refer to:

Veneta, Oregon, a city in Oregon, United States
Veneta Krasteva (born 1991), a Bulgarian beauty pageant winner

See also

Veneti (disambiguation)
Veneto (disambiguation)